Khorramabad International Airport  is an airport in Khorramabad, Iran.

History
In mid-1943, during the Second World War, the Allies fled to the military camp of Badrabad, the headquarters of combat and military forces of Hindi, English, and American, and Khorramabad's runway was 20 meters long and was used for 1800 meters. It was used only for military aircraft. At that time, the runway was earthy.

After the end of the Second World War, airplanes transported a family of military officers from Khorramabad to Tehran once a week. Until the National Iranian Oil Company and Lorestan Telecommunication Company purchased and restructured the airport land. Approximately 1800 m bands were paved for use on small postal aircraft, and a small guard room and a small building were built to rest passengers. At that time, Mohammad Reza Shah came to Khorramabad to open the transmission line and ordered the oil minister Manouchehr Iqbal to buy the land around the airport and move the Misigal Village near the airport to a more distant place.

In 1976, the airport was handed over to the oil company, and the next day the meeting was officially held by the national airline responsible for managing the airport. About 10 people were hired and 2 firefighting vehicles were provided. Sometimes the army or municipal fire brigade also helped. The band was asphalt and 500 m long was added to the bandwidth. In June 1976, a NDB machine and a recorder were installed. The first 60-passenger passenger flight opened with the presence of civil aviation officials. Every day, from the central Khorramabad Police Station, 10 policemen, a captain's officer and a captain arrived at the airport for check-ins, and after flying. An advanced VOR / DME-D radar was installed at Khorramabad Airport in 2013. On May 29, 2015, the first international flight was made from Khorramabad Airport to the city of Najaf, Ashraf in Iraq. In line with the development of the city of Khorramabad and the international airport in Khorramabad, on August 13, 2015, Khorramabad flight to Baghdad was launched by Taban Airlines.

Airlines and destinations

References

External links 
 

Airports in Iran
Buildings and structures in Lorestan Province
Transportation in Lorestan Province